The Erickson House, at 290 N. 300 West in Beaver, Utah, was built around 1900. It was listed on the National Register of Historic Places in 1982.

It is a one-and-a-half-story black rock cottage which was built by Alexander Boyter.

References

External links

National Register of Historic Places in Beaver County, Utah
Houses completed in 1900